Persistence in linguistics refers to one of the five principles by which grammaticalisation can be detected while it is taking place. The other four are: layering, divergence, specialisation, and de-categorialisation.

"When a form undergoes grammaticalization from a lexical to a grammatical function, as long as it is grammatically viable some traces of its original lexical meanings tend to adhere to it, and details of its lexical history may be reflected in constraints on its grammatical distribution." (Hopper 1991: 22)

"The principle of persistence relates the meaning and function of a grammatical form to its history as a lexical morpheme. This relationship is often completely opaque by the stage of morphologisation, but during intermediate stages it may be expected that a form will be polysemous, and that one or more of its meaning will reflect a dominant earlier meaning." (Hopper 1991: 28) In other words, grammaticalisation can be a 'diachronic' explanatory parameter for certain otherwise hard-to-explain 'synchronic' (semantic and distributional) properties of grammatical signs.

The lexical roots of a grammaticalised feature may remain visible in its grammatical function and may influence its grammatical distribution.

References 

 Lessau, Donald A. A Dictionary of Grammaticalization. Bochum: Brockmeyer, 1994.
 Hopper, Paul J. “On some principles of grammaticization”. In Elizabeth Closs Traugott and Bernd Heine, eds. Approaches to Grammaticalization, Vol. I. Amsterdam: John Benjamins, 1991. pp. 17–36.

Historical linguistics